The 2011–12 Liga Indonesia Premier Division season is the seventeenth edition of Liga Indonesia Premier Division since its establishment in 1994. The competition is managed by PT Liga Indonesia (LI).

This season is the first season of Liga Indonesia Premier Division organized by LI without authorization from PSSI as it has decided to appoint the new PT Liga Prima Indonesia Sportindo (LPIS) to organize the competition. It is then recognized by PSSI breakaway leadership under La Nyalla Matalatti.

The participant initially consists of 30 clubs, later reduced to 26 clubs, and finally reduced to only 22 club, divided into two groups. The fixtures were released on 13 December 2011. The season kicked off on 15 December 2011 and is scheduled to conclude in July 2012.

Teams

Groups
The Competition originally consisted of 30 teams before reduced in to 26 teams because of 4 teams switching to other competitions, and divided into 2 Groups of 13 teams, before 4 teams (PSBI Blitar, Persewangi Banyuwangi, PSCS Cilacap, and Madiun Putra FC.) decided to withdraw to join LPIS, changing the number of teams from 26 to 22.

NOTE : ‡ denotes teams that withdrew to join the LPIS version of the Premier Division.

Stadium and locations

1 = Perssin Sinjai used Mattoangin Stadium while Andi Bintang Stadium was being renovated.

Personnel and kit

Note: Flags indicate national team as has been defined under FIFA eligibility rules. Players and Managers may hold more than one non-FIFA nationality.

Managerial changes

Note: 
1 = Just lead the team in one match on 12 April 2012 against Persitema Temanggung.

Foreign player

West Region

Note:
1Those players who were born and started their professional career abroad but have since gained Indonesia Residency;
2Replacement of foreign players in the second phase of the Transfer Windows;
3New players in the second phase of the Transfer Windows

East Region

Note:
1Those players who were born and started their professional career abroad but have since gained Indonesia Residency;
2Replacement of foreign players in the second phase of the Transfer Windows;
3New players in the second phase of the Transfer Windows

First round

Group 1

Results

Group 2

Results

Second round
Second stage started on 25 June 2012 in Gelora Delta Stadium, Sidoarjo. with matches played in Gelora Delta Stadium, Sidoarjo, Surajaya Stadium, Lamongan, Mandala Krida Stadium, Yogyakarta, and U.N.Y Stadium, Yogyakarta. and concluded on 1 July 2012.

Qualified Teams

Group A 

5 matches were played in Gelora Delta Stadium, Sidoarjo.
1 match were played in Surajaya Stadium, Lamongan.
All times are Western Indonesia Time (WIB) – UTC+07:00.

Group B 

5 matches were played in Mandala Krida Stadium, Yogyakarta.
1 match were played in U.N.Y Stadium, Yogyakarta.
All times are Western Indonesia Time (WIB) – UTC+07:00.

Knockout stage

The knockout stage is scheduled to begin on 5 July 2012 and to be completed on 7 July 2012 at the Manahan Stadium in Solo, Central Java.

Semi-finals

Third-placed

Final

Champions

Promotion/relegation play-off 

NB:
(O) = Play-off winner; (P) = Promoted to 2012–13 Indonesia Super League; (R) = Relegated to 2012–13 Liga Indonesia Premier Division.

Season statistics

Top scorers

Own goals

Hat-tricks

 4 Player scored 4 goals

Scoring
First goal of the season: Emile Linkers for PSIM Yogyakarta against Persita Tangerang (15 December 2011)
Last goal of the season: Ade Jantra for Persita Tangerang against PS Barito Putera (8 July 2012)
Fastest goal of the season: 43 seconds – Sugeng Wahyudi for Barito Putera against Persid Jember (16 January 2012)
Widest winning margin: 6 goals
Perseru Serui 6–0 Persigo Gorontalo (3 June 2012)
Highest scoring game: 7 goals
Perssin 5–2 Persigo Gorontalo (22 February 2012)
Persebaya DU (Bhayangkara) 6–1 PSGL Gayo Lues (2 June 2012)
Most goals scored in a match by a single team: 6 goals
Persebaya DU (Bhayangkara) 6–1 PSGL Gayo Lues (2 June 2012)
Perseru Serui 6–0 Persigo Gorontalo (3 June 2012)
Most goals scored in a match by a losing team: 2 goals
Mojokerto Putra 2–3 Barito Putera (29 January 2012)
Persitara North Jakarta 4–2 Persitema Temanggung (16 February 2012)
Perssin Sinjai 5–2 Persigo Gorontalo ((22 February 2012))
Persiku Kudus 3–2 PSGL Gayo Lues (1 March 2012)
Persis Solo 4–2 PSGL Gayo Lues (4 March 2012)
Persekam Metro 3–2 Perseru Serui (15 May 2012)
Widest away winning margin: 3 goals
Perssin Sinjai 0–3(w.o) Persepam Madura United (1 March 2012)
Mojokerto Putra 0–3 West Sumbawa (10 March 2012)
Perssin Sinjai 0–3(w.o) Persid Jember (31 March 2012)
Mojokerto Putra 0–3(w.o) Persid Jember (15 April 2012)
Most goals scored by an away team: 3 goals
PSBS Biak Numfor 1–3 Persepam Madura United (3 January 2012)
PSBS Biak Numfor 1–3 Barito Putera (7 January 2012)
PSGL Gayo Lues 1–3 Persebaya DU (Bhayangkara) (16 January 2012)
Mojokerto Putra 2–3 Barito Putera (29 January 2012)
Perssin Sinjai 0–3(w.o) Persepam Madura United (1 March 2012)
Mojokerto Putra 0–3 West Sumbawa (10 March 2012)
Perssin Sinjai 0–3(w.o) Persid Jember (31 March 2012)
Mojokerto Putra 0–3(w.o) Persid Jember (15 April 2012)
PS Bengkulu 1–3 Persita Tangerang (2 June 2012)
Persih Tembilahan 1–3 Persebaya DU (Bhayangkara) (13 June 2012)

Clean sheets
Most Clean Sheets: 11
Barito Putera
Fewest clean sheets: 3
Persekam Metro
Persigo Gorontalo

References

LI